Western Province United is a South African football club. Formed via the purchase of Umtata Bucks by Delphisure Insurance Brokers owner Mr Vango Kolovos. In September 2006, they finally settled with the current name of the club: Western Province United FC.

In late 2007, businessman Dumisani Ndlovu, who previously owned Benoni Premier United, purchased WP United for R6.2 million. The club was relegated in May 2008 to play in Vodacom League, and was further relegated in May 2011 to SAFA Regional League, being the fourth and lowest level of South African football. The Western Province United FC is currently owned by Western Cape Sport School.

External links
Western Province United Official Website
Official website for National First Division
SAFA Official Website -database with results of Vodacom League

Association football clubs established in 1998
SAFA Second Division clubs
Soccer clubs in the Western Cape
Soccer clubs in Cape Town
1998 establishments in South Africa